The Houghton telescope or Lurie–Houghton telescope is a catadioptric telescope. Houghton's original design uses a two-lens corrector at the front of the telescope and a spherical mirror at the back; it was patented in 1944. Instead of the hard to make intricately shaped compound curve Schmidt corrector plate, or the heavy Maksutov-type meniscus corrector lens, the Houghton double-lens corrector is relatively easy to make.

It consists of two lenses: A positive and a negative, set at the front of the telescope which fixes the telescope's aperture. All lens and mirror surfaces are spherical, which eases construction. These lenses are relatively thin, though not as thin as the Schmidt corrector. Light loss and "ghost" reflections, troublesome in the past, are minimal with modern anti-reflective coatings.

Lurie's modification of Houghton's original design places a diagonal mirror on the corrector, to direct the focused light outside the telescope tube in the same way as a Newtonian telescope; doing so allows a shorter focal length and wider field of view.

The corrector 
Each surface of the lenses in the corrector
creates a degree of freedom to correct optical aberrations. There are enough degrees of freedom to correct for spherical aberration, coma, and field curvature. It is placed in the path of the incoming light rays, which are parallel, so the residual chromatic aberration is very nearly zero. The Houghton corrector can be made of the same type of glass (usually BK7) which reduces cost. The design tolerances are very relaxed, compared to the similar Maksutov telescopes.

There are two types of correctors: symmetric and asymmetric. However, the correction is not quite as good as with the asymmetric corrector, which has four different radii.

The following figure shows the equations necessary to design the symmetric-form of the corrector.

The mirrors 
Unlike the paraboloidal mirror used in the Newtonian telescope, the Houghton uses a spheroidal primary mirror. A spheroidal mirror is much easier to make because the entire surface appears to uniformly "black out" when checked with a Foucault test. In the Houghton and the Lurie–Houghton, the radius of curvature of the primary mirror is slightly less than that of the total system. The diameter of the primary mirror should be larger than the aperture set by the corrector, to reduce vignetting.

The secondary mirror in the Lurie–Houghton is identical to the secondary mirror in a Newtonian telescope. An advantage of the Lurie–Houghton over the Newtonian is that the secondary mirror can be mounted to one of the corrector lenses, thus eliminating the spider mount. This eliminates star image diffraction spikes, caused by the vanes of the spider mount.

Notes

References

See also
 List of telescope types
 Newtonian telescope

External links
 

Telescope types